In association football, or soccer, scoring a goal is the only method of scoring. In  National Collegiate Athletic Association (NCAA) Division I soccer, where a player's career is at most four seasons long, it is considered a notable achievement to reach the 60-goal threshold. In even rarer instances, players have reached the 80 and 100-goal plateaus. The top 30 highest goal-scorers in NCAA Division I men's soccer history are listed below. The NCAA did not split into its current divisions format until August 1973. From 1959 to 1971, there were no classifications to the NCAA nor its predecessor, the Intercollegiate Soccer Football Association (ISFA). Then, from 1972 to 1973, colleges were classified as either "NCAA University Division (Major College)" or "NCAA College Division (Small College)".

Key

List

References

External links 
 NCAA Division I Men's Soccer Record Book

NCAA Division I men's soccer statistical leaders